Scott Calderwood (born 11 March 1978) is an English retired professional footballer and current manager of DOVO.

Calderwood is the son of Jimmy Calderwood and has played for a number of Dutch clubs, including Willem II, Heracles Almelo and SV Babberich.

Scott lives in Doetinchem and is owner of a fitnessclub.

Coaching career
Calderwood started his manager career at DZC '68 in 2008. He then became the assistant manager for Ross County on 21 February 2011 under his father Jimmy Calderwood. He left the position three months later, and moved to Dubai for four months where he worked four months, before returning in the summer 2011, and then he became the manager of AVW '66 which he was until August 2012. He was also accountmanager at Heracles Almelo from March 2012. But in October 2012 he left the clubs for an adventure in Dubai at Hatta Club. 6 games later, he was fired in December 2012. He then returned to his job as an accountmanager at Heracles Almelo.

In the summer 2013, he became the manager of SP Silvolde once again which he was until June 2016. However, he was also appointed as assistant manager for Go Ahead Eagles in June 2015 until June 2016, alongside his manager job at SP Silvolde.

In the summer 2016, Calderwood then became the manager of SV DFS. In January 2019 it was announced, that Calderwood would take a break after the season, but however, he decided to step back already in April 2019. During his time at SV DFS, Calderwood also had several positions at FC Dordrecht. From the summer 2018 until January 2019, he was also the manager of the clubs U-21 team, the assistant coach of the first team and the caretaker manager from mid November until the end of 2018.

On 29 November 2019, he was appointed manager of DOVO.

Agency & Fitness
In 2011, Calderwood also founded Soccerfitness by Scott Calderwood.

References

1978 births
Living people
English footballers
English expatriate footballers
Eredivisie players
Willem II (football club) players
Heracles Almelo players
FC Dordrecht managers
Association football midfielders
English football managers
Association football coaches
Expatriate football managers in the United Arab Emirates
English expatriate football managers
Footballers from Birmingham, West Midlands
English people of Scottish descent
British emigrants to the Netherlands
Ross County F.C. non-playing staff
English expatriate sportspeople in the United Arab Emirates
English expatriate sportspeople in the Netherlands
Expatriate footballers in the Netherlands
Expatriate football managers in the Netherlands